The 2011 Japanese Super Cup was held on 26 February 2011 between the 2010 J.League champions Nagoya Grampus and the 2010 Emperor's Cup winner Kashima Antlers. The match was drawn at the end of regulation time and Nagoya Grampus went on to win the match 3–1 in penalties.

Match details

See also
2010 J.League Division 1
2010 Emperor's Cup

References

Japanese Super Cup
Super
Kashima Antlers matches
Nagoya Grampus matches
Japanese Super Cup 2011